The Historic Lobo Theater is a movie theater located along historic Route 66, at  3013 Central Avenue NE in Albuquerque, New Mexico in the United States of America. 

The Lobo Theater first opened on August 19, 1938. By the early-1940’s it was operated by Paramount Pictures Inc. through their subsidiary Hoblitzelle & O'Donnell. The name Lobo ("Wolf" in Spanish) references the nickname for the sports teams, and students, at the University of New Mexico, which is nearly adjacent to the west. The theater reached out to area students and was a premiere venue for independent, classic and cult films. It also hosted concerts with local bands.

It was the primary setting for the 2002 independent film Collecting Rooftops, which started being filmed while the theater was under Bobby (Robert) McMullan's operation and finished its filming, in the theater, by the generosity of Amon Re (musician).

The Historic Lobo Theater reopened in late 2021 as the Lobo Lounge and Event Venue.  (Website https://loboabq.com/)

References 

Cinemas and movie theaters in New Mexico
Buildings and structures in Albuquerque, New Mexico
Economy of Albuquerque, New Mexico
Buildings and structures on U.S. Route 66